Capay may refer to:
Capay, California, in Yolo County
Capay, Glenn County, California
Capay Hills
Capay Valley
Capay Valley AVA